Manuel Andújar (born 4 June 1996) is an Argentine four-wheeled motorcycle racer. He won the 2021 Dakar Rally in the quad category, winning 2 stages in the process. He also won the 2021 FIM Cross-Country Rallies World Championship in the quad category, the last rider to do so.

Career results

Rally Dakar results

References

Sportspeople from Buenos Aires Province
1996 births
Living people
Enduro riders
Argentine motorcycle racers
Dakar Rally motorcyclists
Dakar Rally winning drivers
Off-road motorcycle racers